Frederick Alfred William Freer (4 December 1915 – 2 November 1998) was an Australian cricketer who played in one Test match in 1946.

Freer was a fast-medium bowler more accurate than Keith Miller. While playing for Victoria, Freer was called into the Australian team for the Second Test in Sydney against England in 1946 after Australia's then leading fast bowler Ray Lindwall was struck down by chickenpox.

In the first innings Freer bowled Cyril Washbrook for one and appealed for lbw against Len Hutton in the first ball of the second innings. It was turned down, but Freer had the wickets of Denis Compton (caught by Don Bradman) and Jack Ikin. When batting Australia wanted runs and Freer hit 3 fours and a 6 in his 28 not out, the only time he batted for Australia. Lindwall recovered in time for the next match, and Freer was dropped.

Freer also played Australian rules football for Victorian Football Association side Yarraville.

References

1915 births
1998 deaths
Australia Test cricketers
Victoria cricketers
Commonwealth XI cricketers
Australian cricketers
Cricketers from Melbourne
Yarraville Football Club players
People from Carlton North, Victoria